Hugh of Saxony or Hugh de Saxony (ca. 850 – 880) was a Frankish prince, and a member of the Carolingian dynasty. He was born in Saxony around 850, the illegitimate son of Louis the Younger and an unnamed concubine. It is possible he was also the brother of another illegitimate son, Bernhard. He was born during the reign of his grandfather Louis the German.

At an early age, Hugh was appointed count of Saxony.  He was immediately despatched to the East Saxon border, where after he is known to have fought in border skirmishes with both Hungarian and Viking forces. In 880 he was killed at the Battle of Thimeon by Viking raiders.

References

Sources

880 deaths
9th-century rulers in Europe
Military personnel killed in action
Carolingian dynasty
Year of birth uncertain
Sons of kings